Susanne Gun Emilia Ringell (28 February 1955, Helsinki) is a Finnish writer and actress. She graduated from Helsinki Theatre Academy as an actor in 1981 and has mainly worked as a freelance actor and writer. Her only permanent employment has been at the Swedish Theatre in 1981–1983.
Ringell's husband was actor-writer Anders Larsson (1952–2021). Ringell was granted an artist's pension in 2019.

Awards and honours
 1994 – Granberg-Sumeliuska prize for Det förlovade Barnet
 1995 – Prix Italia main prize for Vestalen
 1998 – Award of the Society of Swedish Literature in Finland for the short story collection Åtta kroppar
 2004 – Prix Europa Radio France for Och om bettlare och vägmän
 2004 – Svenska Litteratursällskapet society award for the novel Katt begraven
 2008 – Hugo Bergroth Award
 2010 – Svenska Yle's literary award for Vattnen
 2010 – Bergbom prize of the Society of Swedish Literature in Finland
 2015 – Award of the Society of Swedish Literature in Finland

Selected works
Det förlovade barnet (short stories, 1993)
Vestalen: Ett radioporträtt med störningar (1994)
Gall eller Våra osynliga väntrum: En berättelse i sviter (1994)
Vara sten (1996)
Åtta kroppar (1998)
Av blygsel blev Adele fet: Alfabetiska nedslag (short stories, 2000)
Katt begraven (novel, 2003)
En god Havanna: Besläktat (short stories, 2006)
Ryggens nymåne: Prosalyrisk svit (2009)
Simma näck: En pjäs (2009)
Vattnen (short stories, 2010)
På utvägen var jag en annan (2012)
Guiden (2014)
Tärnornas station (2014)
God morgon (2017)
 Frimärken (2019)

References

1955 births
Living people
Writers from Helsinki
20th-century Finnish writers
21st-century Finnish writers
20th-century Finnish women writers
21st-century Finnish women writers
Finnish short story writers
Finnish novelists
20th-century Finnish actresses